An engineering officer or simply engineer, is a licensed mariner qualified and responsible for operating and maintaining the propulsion plants and support systems for a watercraft and its crew, passengers and cargo. Engineering officers are usually educated and qualified as engineering technicians.

Ship engineers are responsible for propulsion and other ship systems such as: electrical power generation plant; steam boilers; lighting; fuel oil; lubrication; water distillation and separation; air conditioning; refrigeration; sewage treatment and water systems on board the vessel. They require knowledge and hands-on experience with electric power, electronics, pneumatics, hydraulics, chemistry, steam generation, gas turbines and even nuclear technology on certain military and civilian vessels.

Ranks and titles

There are several types and ranks of engine officer that are employed in the engine department of a ship

Watchstanding officers 

Chief engineer: In charge of the engine department.A chief engineer shares rank equivalent to ship's captain. 
Second engineer: In charge of the day-to-day running of the engine department. Often in charge of main engine maintenance. Takes the 4–8 watch.
Third engineer: Usually in charge auxiliary engines & boilers. Takes the 12–4 watch.
Fourth engineer: Usually in charge of air compressors, purifiers, pumps and other auxiliary machinery. Takes the 8–12 watch.  Sometimes in charge of boilers.

Electrical officers 
Electrical officers do not participate in watchstanding of the engine department, but are present on more sophisticated vessels to take charge of electronic and electrical equipment

Electro-technical officer (ETO): Officer who is responsible for the maintenance of electronic equipment including automation systems and instrumentation process and control equipment, and/or general electrical equipment. Reports to Chief Engineer.
 Electrical officer: Officer who is responsible for the maintenance of general electrical equipment such as motors, transformers, lights, reefer outlets etc. Reports to ETO / Chief Engineer.

Other positions 

 Junior engineer: Officer who is qualified as fourth engineer but lacks the experience to take a watch. Assists with all engine department duties.
 Engine/ETO cadet: A trainee engine officer or ETO. Understudies the other engine department personnel. Cadets of most countries are sponsored during training by a shipping company, serving their time on board ships owned by that company. Many go on to work as engine officers with their sponsoring company once training is complete.

United States naval use 
United States Navy ships have a varying number of engine officers, depending upon the size of the crew, occupying positions named for subsidiary responsibilities of the Engineering Officer. The two highest ranking subordinates are usually the Main Propulsion Assistant (MPA), responsible for operation and maintenance of propulsion machinery, and the Damage Control Assistant (DCA), responsible for prevention and control of damage. Anticipation of battle damage increases the significance of responsibilities of the latter position on warships. A DCA often stands routine deck or engineering watches, but spends his off-watch time overseeing maintenance of watertight integrity and firefighting equipment. A DCA's battle station normally includes responsibility for controlling the ship's stability, list and trim by flooding and dewatering undamaged compartments as necessary to prevent capsizing. Additional engine officers may include an Electrical Officer, responsible for the ship's electrical generating and distribution system as described above, and an Auxiliaries (or A Division) Officer, responsible for pumps, ventilation blowers, refrigeration compressors, and windlass machinery as described above for the Fourth Engineer.

See also

References

Marine occupations
Maritime safety